Marco Aurélio dos Santos (born 7 October 1974), commonly known as Marquinho, is a former Brazilian futsal player who plays as a Pivot during his career.

Honours
1 World Championship (2008)
5 División de Honor (2001/02, 2002/03, 2003/04, 2004/05, 2007/08)
5 Supercopas de España (2002/03, 2003/04, 2005/06, 2007/08, 2008/09)
4 Copas de España (2003/04, 2004/05, 2006/07, 2008/09)
3 UEFA Futsal Cup (2004, 2006, 2009)
5 Intercontinental Cup (1999, 2005, 2006, 2007, 2008)
1 Recopa de Europa (2008)
2 Copas Ibéricas (2003/04, 2005/06)
4 Campeonatos de Liga Estatal (1996, 1997, 1998, 2000)
2 Campeonatos de Liga Nacional (2000, 2001)
1 Copa Brasil (2000)
1 Grand Prix (2009)
1 Copa Río São Paulo (2000)
2 Campeonatos Sudamericanos (1999, 2008)
2 Pan American Games (2007, 2008)
1 FIFA Tournament (Singapur 1999)
1 Portugal Tournament (2001)
1 best Pívot LNFS (2007/08)
2 best player Supercopa España (2003, 2004)
1 best player Intercontinental Cup (2005)

References

External links
lnfs.es

1974 births
Living people
Brazilian men's futsal players
Futsal players at the 2007 Pan American Games
Inter FS players
Nagoya Oceans players
Pan American Games gold medalists for Brazil
Pan American Games medalists in futsal
Medalists at the 2007 Pan American Games